Fun! Fun! Fun! is a pop-punk album by Japanese pop punk band Shonen Knife, released on July 6, 2007 on Blues Interactions Japan. The album marked the 25th anniversary of the band.

A remastered version with all-English lyrics (catalog number BF-7CD) was on sale during the band's European tour in 2009. The cover art of the English version has a blue background in place of the Japanese version's green background, and is in a regular CD jewel case instead of the Japanese version's cardboard gate-fold case.

Track listing (Japanese version)
 "重力無重力"
 "Barnacle"（ふじつぼ）
 "Flu"（インフルエンザ）
 "Ramones Forever"
 "Las Vegas"
 "Birthday"
 "ポップコーン" (Popcorn)
 "クッキーたべたい" (I Wanna Eat Cookies)
 "みなみのしま" (Southern Islands)
 "おやすみ" (Goodnight)

Track listing (English version)

 Gravity Zero Gravity
 Barnacle
 Flu
 Ramones Forever
 Las Vegas
 Birthday
 Popcorn
 I Wanna Eat Cookies
 Southern Islands
 Good Night

Personnel
Naoko Yamano - guitar, vocals
Atsuko Yamano - bass, backing vocals
Etsuko Nakanishi - drums, backing vocals

References

Shonen Knife albums
2007 albums